Filthy Rich is a New Zealand comedy drama television series created by Rachel Lang and Gavin Strawhan. It premiered on 15 February 2016 on TVNZ 2. The show revolves around three illegitimate half siblings who discover they have a claim to a fortune to one of the wealthiest men in New Zealand, John Truebridge. When he dies these unwanted heirs stand to share in his legacy but not if his legitimate family has anything to do with it.

Production

On 28 May 2015 it was announced by the New Zealand Herald that the country's most expensive tv show had started filming. The show was granted NZ$8.25M by the New Zealand government agency, New Zealand On Air.

The show premiered on 15 February 2016.

On 26 July 2016, it was announced the show was renewed for a second season and was granted a further NZ$6.9M in funding from New Zealand on Air. On 13 June 2017 a promo was released for the second season on the show's official Facebook page.

The second season premiered on 11 July 2017.

On 15 December 2017 it was announced via the show's official Facebook page that the show did not get renewed for a third season.

Plot
After John Truebridge, one of the wealthiest men in New Zealand, commits suicide, it is revealed that John has three illegitimate children: Joe, Savannah, and Garth. His son John Jnr is not thrilled that he now has to share his father's fortune.

Cast and characters

Main
Miriama Smith as Brady Truebridge, second wife of John Truebridge. A former hairdresser from Gisborne now head of one of the country's largest corporations after her husband's death.
Josh McKenzie as John Truebridge Jnr, son of John Truebridge who is a handsome, but also arrogant 30-year-old man. He has an addiction to gambling, drugs, and call girls. Doesn't like how he now has to share his father's fortune.
Alex Tarrant as Joe Tamatoa, 24 year old illegitimate son of John Truebridge who was raised in a caring family. Recently found out that his entire life was a lie when he learns that he was adopted after being found in a rubbish bin as an infant.
Emma Fenton as Savannah Fielding, 20 year old illegitimate daughter of John Truebridge. She is a pole dancer at her mother's boyfriend's club, who knows that she is the daughter of a rich man but was shut out of her birthright by Brady.
Taylor Hall as Zac Bryce, Zac poses as his best friend Garth Joster, who is John's other illegitimate son. Garth was put on life support following a car crash.
Elizabeth Hawthorne as Nancy Truebridge, John's sister. She adores Brady and her daughter, Kennedy, but loathes John's first wife, Vivian.
Luciane Buchanan as Kennedy, Brady's 15-year-old daughter
Shushila Takao as Ariana, Joe's fiance
Xana Tang as Cherry, Brady's assistant 
Mike Edward as Fisher Brankovic, works for Brady at the Truebridge Hunt Corporation

Recurring
Theresa Healey as Vivian Hunt Trubridge, John's ex-wife and mother to John Jnr
Cristina Serban Ionda as Maria, Brady's maid
Jay Simon as Alan Griever, Minister/Politician 
Tania Anderson as Gillian Joster, Garth's mother
Jodie Rimmer as Lorna Fielding, Savannah's mother
Erroll Shand as Karl Reichman, Lorna's boyfriend
Simon Prast as Sir Douglas, Executive Chair of Truebridge Hunt Corporation's board
Becky McEwan as Grace Halloway, Kennedy's school friend
Joe Folau as Snake, gang member financing Karl's club
Emily Robins as Toni Van Asch, PR consultant friend of John Jnr
Jared Turner as Sam Halloway, Grace's father
Siobhan Page as Roxy van Buren, Savannah's friend working at the club
Nick Davies as Garth Joster, the real Garth
Mark Mitchinson as Lloyd Maxwell, rival businessman of John Snr
Bonnie Soper as Annabelle Maxwell, Lloyd's socialite daughter
Kirk Torrance as Ariki Campbell, Brady's ex and Kennedy's biological father
Jay Saussey as Megan Campbell, Ariki's wife
Matthew Walker as Ford Hathaway, John Jnr's friend
Katrina Browne as Caroline Brankovich, Fisher's wife

Episodes

Season 1 (2016)

Season 2 (2017)

International airings
In May 2016, it was announced that Hulu had purchased the series for streaming in the United States.

American remake
In October 2017, it was announced that the American television network Fox had commissioned a pilot for a U.S. remake of the show. Tate Taylor (The Help, The Girl on the Train), Imagine Entertainment, and 20th Century Fox Television are behind the remake. In December 2018, Fox had greenlit the series for the 2019–20 television season, and was picked up in May 2019. Kim Cattrall serves as producer and star in the series. It was set to premiere in spring 2020 but was delayed to September 21, 2020 due to COVID-19. In October 2020, the series was cancelled after one season.

References

External links
 
 
 

2010s New Zealand television series
2016 New Zealand television series debuts
2017 New Zealand television series endings
English-language television shows
New Zealand drama television series
Television shows filmed in New Zealand
Television shows funded by NZ on Air
Television shows set in New Zealand
TVNZ 2 original programming